Khanom wong (also referred to as khao mun khuai) is a traditional Thai-style donut that tastes sweet and salty, similar to an American donut. It is made in a similar fashion to pies. Molasses is usually dropped around the center at the top.

History 
Khanom wong originates from the northernmost areas of Northern Province, later spreading throughout the rest of the Northern Province of Thailand.

See also 
 Thai cuisine
 List of Thai desserts
Khanom khai hong – another Thai-style donut

References 

Thai desserts and snacks
Thai doughnuts